Niphona hookeri is a species of beetle in the family Cerambycidae. It was described by Charles Joseph Gahan in 1900.

References

hookeri
Beetles described in 1900